Raghuvir Singh Kadian is a member of the Haryana Legislative Assembly from the Indian National Congress representing the Beri (Vidhan Sabha constituency) in Haryana. He has won election for MLA six times.

References

Year of birth missing (living people)
Living people
Haryana MLAs 2019–2024
Haryana MLAs 2014–2019
Indian National Congress politicians from Haryana
Place of birth missing (living people)